The Boys in Blue is a 1982 British comedy film directed by Val Guest and starring Tommy Cannon, Bobby Ball, Suzanne Danielle and Roy Kinnear. It is loosely based on the 1939 Will Hay film Ask a Policeman, which Guest co-wrote. Some policemen who have failed to make any arrests are threatened with dismissal, and begin to invent crime to justify their existence. It was the final feature film that Guest directed.

Plot

An elaborate theft of priceless paintings has taken place in Central London, and the police are at a loss to explain where they have disappeared to. In the seaside village of Little Botham (pronounced bottom), we encounter the local police force consisting of Constable Ball (Bobby Ball) and Sergeant Cannon (Tommy Cannon), who are concerned with breaking up a traffic jam. One of the delayed drivers is an attractive foreign woman, who Ball causes to collide with a parked car belonging to the Chief Constable (Eric Sykes). It emerges that the woman is part of the gang transporting the paintings.

Ball and Cannon become suspicious of a new arrival in the area, a writer named Hilling (Edward Judd), who they suspect may have something to do with the stolen artworks. The bumbling policemen break into his barn at night but find nothing incriminating, then Hilling threatens them with a gun and chases them away. Next they visit a rich local businessman Lloyd (Roy Kinnear) to ask for information about Hilling but he knows nothing.

The postman brings a letter telling them that the Chief Constable wants to close down their police station because there is no crime in the area. They remember the valuable paintings at Lloyd's house, and decide to steal one of them with the help of their friend Kim, Lloyd's assistant (Suzanne Danielle). They will then be able to solve the crime, justify their existence, and save their police station.

Although Kim refuse to help with their crackpot scheme, Cannon accidentally finds some of the stolen paintings on the beach. However, while he and Ball decide what to do with them, the evidence is removed by a mysterious stranger hidden in their cellar. Kim arrives at the police station, and reports seeing a UFO. Having taken her home, Ball and Cannon see mysterious blue and red flashing lights and think they have found the UFO themselves (although in reality it is a fake ambulance used by the thieves to frighten the locals).

Meanwhile a coast guard (Jon Pertwee) asks for permission to raise a light on the roof of the police station. The reasons for the request are incomprehensible, but lead to some hilarious banter, after which the lamp is raised. Returning to the beach, the police officers find more paintings, a discarded Turkish cigarette, and then stairs leading to a storeroom which turns out to be the cellar of the police station!

Before Ball and Cannon can call the authorities Lloyd arrives, revealing that he is the mastermind behind the crimes and shutting the policemen - handcuffed together due to their own incompetence - in their cell. He cannot transfer the paintings to a boat, as originally planned, so loads them into the fake ambulance and drives off. Our heroes escape from the faulty cell and set off in pursuit. After several changes of vehicle, Ball and Cannon end up chasing Lloyd and the foreign woman (who turns out to be Kim in disguise) in a bus.

Meanwhile customs officers and police, including Hilling who is a DI with the Arts Squad, converge on the Little Botham police station, and find evidence of the crime. They also realise that the lamp on the roof had been used to guide ships to the beach to pick up the paintings, conclude that Ball and Cannon are responsible, and start to search for them.

The hapless Ball and Cannon continue their own pursuit and are diverted onto a race track, where the bus narrowly misses several speeding cars. Eventually, they collide with Lloyd's car and the police, headed by the Chief Constable, arrive. Despite originally believing that Ball and Cannon are to blame, it is quickly revealed that Lloyd is the true culprit and he is arrested. Our heroes, ignored by the Chief Constable and still handcuffed together, begin the long walk home.

Cast
 Tommy Cannon – Sergeant Cannon
 Bobby Ball – PC Ball
 Suzanne Danielle – Kim
 Roy Kinnear – Lloyd
 Eric Sykes – Chief Constable
 Jack Douglas – Chief Superintendent
 Edward Judd – Hilling
 Jon Pertwee – Coastguard
 Arthur English – Farmer

Production

Filming locations

The film was shot primarily at Elstree Studios in Hertfordshire, England, but many other locations throughout the United Kingdom were used, such as Edlesborough, Eaton Bray, Weymouth, Wool, Lulworth Cove, St Albans, Borehamwood and Bushey Heath.

References

External links 
 

1982 films
British crime comedy films
Films shot at EMI-Elstree Studios
1980s English-language films
1980s crime comedy films
1982 comedy films
1980s British films